HMS Usurper (P56) was a Royal Navy U-class submarine built by Vickers-Armstrong at Barrow-in-Furness.  So far she has been the only ship of the Royal Navy to bear the name Usurper.

Career

Usurper had a short-lived career with the Royal Navy.  During her work-up patrol off the Norwegian coast, she made a torpedo attack on the German submarine U-467. The target was not hit.  On being assigned to operate in the Mediterranean, she sank the French ship Château Yquem.

Sinking

Usurper had left Algiers on 24 September 1943 to patrol off La Spezia.  On 3 October 1943 she was ordered to move to the Gulf of Genoa, after which there was no further contact. She was overdue at Algiers on 12 October 1943. The German anti-submarine vessel UJ-2208/Alfred reported attacking a submarine in the Gulf of Genoa on 3 October 1943 and it is believed that this may have been Usurper. During the war, Usurper was adopted by the town of Stroud as part of Warship Week.  The plaque from this adoption is held by the National Museum of the Royal Navy in Portsmouth.

References

Publications
 
 
 
 
 

 

British U-class submarines
Ships built in Barrow-in-Furness
1942 ships
World War II submarines of the United Kingdom
Maritime incidents in October 1943
World War II shipwrecks in the Mediterranean Sea
Ships built by Vickers Armstrong